The canton of Lhuis  is a former administrative division in eastern France. It was disbanded following the French canton reorganisation which came into effect in March 2015. It had 5,769 inhabitants (2012).

The canton comprised 12 communes:

Bénonces
Briord
Groslée
Innimond
Lhuis
Lompnas
Marchamp
Montagnieu
Ordonnaz
Saint-Benoît
Seillonnaz
Serrières-de-Briord

Demographics

See also
Cantons of the Ain department

References

Former cantons of Ain
2015 disestablishments in France
States and territories disestablished in 2015